Chaganti Koteswara Rao is an Indian speaker known for his discourses on Sanatana Dharma. He was also appointed as cultural adviser for the government of Andhra Pradesh in 2016. He was also one of the 10 ambassadors Swacch Andhra Corporation. He is also hired for state government activities. He was bestowed with titles like Pravachana Chakravarti (Emperor of discourses), and Sarada Jnana Putra (son of the Goddess of knowledge Saraswati).

Early life 
Chaganti Koteswara Rao was born on 14 July 1958 to the couple Chaganti Sundara Siva Rao and Chaganti Suseelamma in Eluru, Eluru District, Andhra Pradesh. His father was a staunch follower of Hindu Dharma. During his student days in Eluru, he used to participate in essay writing and elocution competitions on ancient Indian wisdom.

Family 

He is married to Subrahmanyeswari and has two children Shanmukha Charan, and Nagavalli. Both are engineering graduates. He worked for Food Corporation of India in Kakinada and retired as of August 2018. His wife is a state government employee in Agricultural department.

Religious discourses 
Chaganti Koteswara Rao garu regularly gives religious discourses on various Hindu epics like Bhagavata, Ramayana, Mahabharata, and various Puranas. These are broadcast on various radio and TV channels. Some devotional TV channels set aside special slots for airing his discourses. He does not accept any remuneration for delivering a discourse except his traveling expenses.

He has several distinctions for delivering discourses. He completed the discourse on Ramayana in 42 days, Bhagavatam in 42 days, Siva Puranam in 30 days, and Sri Lalita Sahasra Namam in 2-3 months.

Discourses about Films 
He also delivered spiritual discourses based on musical films Sankarabharanam (1980) and Shrutilayalu (1987).

Positions 
Chaganti was appointed as cultural adviser for the government of Andhra Pradesh in 2016. He was also one of the 10 ambassadors Swacch Andhra Corporation.

Awards and honours
 Honour by Ramineni Foundation, USA in 2015.
 Dr Pinnamaneni and Seeta Devi foundation award (2016)

Controversies 
On 5 March 2016, devotees of Shirdi Saibaba staged a protest against Chaganti Koteswara Rao's remarks about worship of Saibaba during a discourse in 2012. Pending case against him is brought to notice of the government. Later on clarification of his discourses holding huge respect significantly withdrawn the protest.

He also faced protests from All India Yadava Mahasabha because of his remarks on Lord Krishna. Later the representatives of the community went to  his residence. He clarified that he hold respect for their community and does not intend to hurt any community.

References

Scholars of Hinduism
Living people
Telugu people
People from West Godavari district
People from Andhra Pradesh
New Age spiritual leaders
Indian spiritual teachers
Indian spiritual writers
1959 births